The Cârcinov is a left tributary of the river Argeș in Romania. It discharges into the Argeș near Topoloveni. It flows through the towns and villages Boțești, Dobrești, Beleți, Albotele, Priboieni, Gorănești, Crintești, Boțârcani, Țigănești and Topoloveni.

References

Rivers of Romania
Rivers of Argeș County